Ditaeniella is a genus of flies in the family Sciomyzidae, the marsh flies or snail-killing flies.

Species
D. grisescens (Meigen, 1830)
D. parallela (Walker, 1853)
D. patagoniensis (Macquart, 1851)
D. trivittata (Cresson, 1920)

References

Sciomyzidae
Sciomyzoidea genera